ESCR may stand for:

Economic, Social and Cultural Rights
Embryonic Stem Cell Research
Environmental Stress Crack Resistance
ES Cannet Rocheville, a French football club